Davulga is a town (belde) and municipality in the Emirdağ District, Afyonkarahisar Province, Turkey. Its population is 2,480 (2021). It consists of 7 quarters: Alasakalli, Sofulu, Domurlu, Hisarköy, Karakuyu and İncik.

Azeri settlements
According to Sevan Nişanyan's Index Anatolicus, several villages in the area of Davulga were originally Azeri settlements: İncik, Karakuyu, Daydalı, Davulga itself, Avdan, Eşrefli, Yeniköy, Gelincik (before 1928: Vahdetiye), Yarıkkaya and Aşağıaliçomak.

References

Populated places in Emirdağ District
Towns in Turkey